Wrath of the Tyrant is the first demo album by the Norwegian black metal band Emperor. It was recorded in May 1992 and self-released by the band shortly after.

Releases 
Wrath of the Tyrant was originally distributed by the band as a demo shortly after it was recorded. This original demotape had a picture of a chimera on the cover. In 1994 it was re-released through Wild Rag Records with two bonus tracks and different artwork. Tchort, who didn't join the band until 1993, is the person who appears on this cover. A limited edition 12" vinyl was released by Head not Found records in 1995; this version featured a photograph of the Scott Monument in Edinburgh as new cover art. In 1998, it was re-mastered and released with the tracks from the Emperor EP. There are two versions of this re-release; the Candlelight Records version has the cover of the Emperor EP and features video footage of live performances from the band, while the Century Black version has a different cover and lacks the video footage.

Most of the songs on Wrath of the Tyrant were later re-recorded by the band. "Wrath of the Tyrant" and "Night of the Graveless Souls" were re-recorded in December 1992 for the Emperor EP. "Ancient Queen", "Witches Sabbath" and "Lord of the Storms" were re-recorded during the same session and released on As the Shadows Rise. "My Empire's Doom" was re-recorded and renamed "Beyond the Great Vast Forest" on the band's debut album, In the Nightside Eclipse. "Moon over Kara-Shehr" was re-recorded with Jan Axel "Hellhammer" Blomberg on drums and released on the compilation Nordic Metal - A Tribute to Euronymous in 1995.

Track listing

1998 edition

Personnel 
 Ygg – guitar, vocals, keyboards
 Samot – drums, guitar, vocals on "Witches Sabbath"
 Mortiis – bass guitar

Additional personnel
Christophe Szpajdel – logo

References 

Emperor (band) EPs
1992 albums
Demo albums
Black metal albums by Norwegian artists